Lawman is a 1971 American revisionist Western film produced and directed by Michael Winner and starring Burt Lancaster, Robert Ryan, Lee J. Cobb and Robert Duvall.

Plot synopsis 

Drunken cowhands from the town of Sabbath are shooting up the western town of Bannock.

Jared Maddox is Bannock's marshal. On the trail of the shooters he rides into Sabbath with the body of Marc Corman one of the cowhands marked for arrest. Corman and five others were involved in the reckless killing of an old man, and Maddox has warrants for them.

Maddox calls on Sabbath's sheriff, Cotton Ryan. He demands that the five surrender to him within 24 hours. Ryan warns Maddox that the five work for Vincent Bronson, a wealthy cattle rancher, and that he should go back to Bannock and avoid a deadly confrontation. Maddox is not frightened and warns they will certainly be killed if they do not surrender.

Ryan goes to Vincent Bronson's ranch to inform him of Marshal Maddox's arrival in Sabbath. Bronson is unaware of the killing in Bannock but offers cash as compensation. Sheriff Ryan explains that Maddox will only accept surrender.

Bronson's defiant foreman, Harv Stenbaugh, wants Maddox killed. Bronson refuses, insisting on negotiation.  When that falls through, his men resolve to kill Maddox, an effort which leeds to the final stand off in the Sabbath town square. Maddox, who has railed against backshooters is driven to betray his own words in a manner which provokes a profound moral ponderance. The action in this film is dry and tersely authentic.There are no pretty cowboys or pretences of morality and the ending has the resolution of a rattle snake bite.

Cast
 Burt Lancaster as Jared Maddox
 Robert Ryan as Cotton Ryan
 Lee J. Cobb as Vincent Bronson
 Robert Duvall as Vernon Adams
 Sheree North as Laura Shelby
 Albert Salmi as Harvey Stenbaugh
 J. D. Cannon as Hurd Price
 Joseph Wiseman as Lucas
 Richard Jordan as Crowe Wheelwright
 John McGiver as Mayor Sam Bolden
 Ralph Waite as Jack Dekker
 John Beck as Jason Bronson
 William C. Watson as Choctaw Lee
 Walter Brooke as Luther Harris
 Robert Emhardt as Hersham
 Richard Bull as Dusaine
 John Hillerman as Totts
 Hugh McDermott as L.G. Moss
 Wilford Brimley as Marc Corman

Production
The film was based on an original script by Gerald Wilson who said he was inspired by an item he read in the journal of Charlie Siringo which said the only hired killers in the old West were the lawmen, and it was they who caused most of the violence. Wilson also wanted to say that "law and order is certainly not the only way to administer justice."

In November 1969, it was reported Michael Winner was scouting locations in Durango and that Burt Lancaster would most likely star. Winner did not want to go to Spain - where many Westerns were shot - because he wanted "an American influence". The film wound up being made in Chupaderos. Winner says he managed to hire the village for filming just before Howard Hawks tried to secure it for Rio Lobo.

Filming began in April 1970.

It was Winner's first Western. "The West is everybody's," he said. "Americans come to Britain to film English history. Why shouldn't an Englishman go west?"

"The West is vulgar," he said. "The West is dirty. It's like a hippie colony. The problem with making a western is you get your priorities the wrong way around. You can't find anywhere to go to the toilet and yet you have to bring everything to a halt the minute one of the horses goes. And then wait to sweep up after it."

Winner later said:
I’d never even done a Western before but I got very serious about it. I had American professors come up and look at locations and I wanted to get the details correct. I asked what they usually used for oil lamps and they said that they just used new ones and threw some dust on them. I told them that was ridiculous and that they could get authentic period oil lamps for 20 quid on the Portobello Road. So the crew were all coming over from England with these things crammed in their luggage. It was the most authentic Western ever made. Everything was real. We sold the set to John Wayne who was coming in and doing another movie on the set after us.

Release dates

Alternative titles

Reception

Critical
Howard Thompson of The New York Times called the film "a potent but curiously exasperating Western" with "a baffling, oblique arrogance about the central character, played well by Lancaster, that belies his seeming quest for justice ('the law is the law'), the point of the film. But he is also a cold, egocentric fish."

Roger Ebert of the Chicago Sun-Times gave the film two stars out of four and called it "a Western with a lot of sides but no center. The bad guys are too monotonously bad to be interesting. The characters played by Lee J. Cobb and Robert Ryan are more interesting, but never get a proper chance to influence events. And the Lancaster character, as limited by Winner, seems driven by some unhealthy inner hang-up that causes the whole movie to go sour. Winner should have told us a lot more about his lawman, or a lot less."

Gene Siskel of the Chicago Tribune awarded two-and-a-half stars out of four and wrote, "It's the opportunity to see some familiar faces that makes 'Lawman' an entertaining Western. It just has to be the faces, because the story is so depressing and poorly conceived."

Variety described it as "a quite entertaining film that never hits many high spots but will amuse western addicts," adding, "Lancaster, as usual, is a highly convincing marshal, tough and taciturn. Ryan is also excellent as the faded, weak marshal with only memories. But it's Cobb who quietly steals the film as the local boss who, unlike many in such films, is no ruthless villain."

Kevin Thomas of the Los Angeles Times called it "a good solid western" with Cobb "a fine and worthy adversary" to Lancaster. Gary Arnold of The Washington Post stated that the film "smells of confused plotting, gratuitous brutality and a veritable outbreak of overripe dialogue." John Pidgeon of The Monthly Film Bulletin called the story "utterly conventional" and concluded that "despite the acting, the theme—of the morality of taking life in the name of the law—is ill-served by Winner's fashionable attention to gore, not to mention his hotch-potch of styles, as tiresome as the frenetically zooming camera."

The film holds a score of 63% on Rotten Tomatoes based on 8 reviews.

References

Notes

External links
 Official site
 
 
 
Lawman at Letterbox DVD

1971 films
1971 Western (genre) films
American Western (genre) films
1970s English-language films
United Artists films
Films directed by Michael Winner
Films scored by Jerry Fielding
United States Marshals Service in fiction
Revisionist Western (genre) films
Films produced by Michael Winner
1970s American films